Danelle Im (born 21 January 1993) is a South Korean ice hockey player.

Career
She competed in the 2018 Winter Olympics as part of a unified team of 35 players drawn from both North and South Korea. The team's coach was Sarah Murray and the team was in Group B competing against Switzerland, Japan and Sweden.

References

1993 births
Living people
Canadian women's ice hockey forwards
Canadian sportspeople of Korean descent
Canadian people of South Korean descent
Ice hockey players at the 2018 Winter Olympics
Olympic ice hockey players of South Korea
South Korean women's ice hockey forwards
Ice hockey people from Toronto
Winter Olympics competitors for Korea